Childwall is a suburb and ward of Liverpool, England, located to the southeast of the city. It is bordered by Belle Vale, Bowring Park, Broadgreen, Gateacre, Mossley Hill, and Wavertree. In 2019, the population was 13,640.

Overview
The earliest recorded reference to Childwall was in the Domesday Book of 1086: "Four Radmans held Childwall as four Manors. There is half a hide. It was worth eight shillings. There was a priest, having half a carucate of land in frank almoign." Childwall was known as Cileuuelle in the 1086 Domesday Book, meaning "a stream where youngsters meet" from the Old English words cild and wella. Historically, the name has been recorded as Childewalle (1212 and 1332), Chaldewall (1238), Childwall (1261), Childewelle (1291), Chaldewal (1305), and Childewall (1354).

Childwall was traditionally part of the West Derby Hundred. It was an urban district from the Local Government Act 1894 until Liverpool annexed it in 1913. The suburb's All Saints' Church is the oldest church in Liverpool. Though Childwall still maintains a large Jewish community, this has been in gradual decline since the 1980s, with some of the former Jewish community now living in the nearby suburbs of Allerton and Gateacre.

Childwall has a large roundabout called the Childwall Fiveways, which is one of the busiest in Liverpool. Since the year 2000, the area immediately surrounding the Fiveways has gradually developed into an area for bars and restaurants. Childwall's pubs include the Childwall Abbey Hotel, the Halfway House, and the Childwall Fiveways Hotel. Housing in Childwall is almost entirely detached or semi-detached, and there are very few terraced houses.

The television production company Lime Pictures, formerly Mersey Television, is headquartered on a patch of private land in Childwall Woods. The company's most notable productions are Hollyoaks, Brookside, Grange Hill, Geordie Shore, and The Only Way Is Essex. The first three are filmed in Childwall, while the last two are respectively filmed in Newcastle and Brentwood.

Education

Primary schools
Childwall Church of England Primary School
King David Schools (encompassing a Nursery, Primary, High School, and Sixth Form)
Our Lady's Bishop Eton Roman Catholic Primary & Junior School
Rudston Infant & Junior School
St Paschal Baylon Roman Catholic Primary School

Secondary schools
Childwall Academy

King David High School

Higher education
Liverpool Hope University

Transport
The nearest railway stations are Mossley Hill or Broadgreen. Historically, there was also Childwall railway station. Regular bus services connect the district with Liverpool John Lennon Airport and the city centre, as well as surrounding districts.

Notable people
Brian Barwick, sports team chairman
Craig Charles, actor, lived in Childwall as a teen
Jodie Comer, actress, raised in Childwall
Edwina Currie, politician
Les Dennis, television presenter, partly raised in Childwall
Brian Epstein, manager of the Beatles, raised in Childwall
Jon Flanagan, footballer
Alex Fletcher, actress, born in Childwall
Samantha Giles, actress, lived in Childwall whilst filming Hollyoaks
Jason Isaacs, actor, partly raised in Childwall
Simon Jones, musician, partly raised in Childwall
Jeremiah Markland, classical scholar, born in Childwall
Ray Quinn, actor, singer, born in Childwall
Ian St John, footballer, lived in Childwall while playing for Liverpool
Dai Davies, footballer, lived in Childwall while playing for Everton in 1970s

Governance
The elected councillors for Childwall are Cllr Liz Parsons of the Labour Party, and Cllr Carole Storey and Cllr Alan Tormey of the Liberal Democrats.

References

External links

 Liverpool City Council, Ward Profile: Childwall (March 2006)
 Port Cities: Childwall Fiveways photo (1935)
 Port Cities: Childwall Valley Road photo (1931)
 Disused Stations: Childwall

Areas of Liverpool